In the anatomy of the heart, the valve of the coronary sinus (also called the Thebesian valve, after Adam Christian Thebesius) is a valve located at the orifice of the coronary sinus where the coronary sinus drains into the right atrium. It prevents blood from flowing backwards into the coronary sinus during contraction of the heart.

Anatomy 
The valve of the coronary sinus is a thin, semilunar (half-moon-shaped) valve located on the anteroinferior part of the opening into the right atrium. It is formed by as semicircular fold of the lining membrane of the right atrium. It is situated at the base of the inferior vena cava.

Variation 
The valve may be completely absent; it is present in 73-86% of individuals.

The valve may vary in size. It may be double, or it may be cribriform (containing numerous small holes).

Function 
The valve prevents regurgitation of blood into the sinus during diastole (i.e. the contraction of the atrium).

References

Cardiac anatomy